USS Accentor (LCI(L)-652/LSIL-652/AMCU-15) was an  in the service of the United States Navy, named after the accentor bird.

She was laid down as the unnamed LCI(L)-652 on 10 June 1944 at Barber, New Jersey by New Jersey Shipbuilding, launched on 13 July 1944, and commissioned on 19 July 1944.

After shakedown training during the summer of 1944, the large infantry landing craft joined the Pacific Fleet. She operated in various rear areas of the Pacific Ocean through the end of World War II and, after Japan capitulated in mid-August 1945, continued similar activity into the summer of 1946. On 19 July of that year, LCI(L)-652 was placed out of commission and was berthed with the Columbia River Group of the Pacific Reserve Fleet. While inactive during the remainder of her Navy career, she was redesignated LSIL-652 on 28 February 1949. Late in October 1950, the ship was nominated for conversion to an underwater mine locator ship. Accordingly, she was named Accentor and redesignated AMCU-15 on 7 March 1952. In May 1952, she was reassigned from the Columbia River Group to the Bremerton Group in preparation for her reconditioning.

However, Accentor never returned to active service. Her conversion was cancelled on 22 January 1954, and she remained inactive at Bremerton, Washington. On 1 July 1954, her name and new classification were also cancelled, and she reverted to LSIL-652.

References
 

 

LCI(L)-351-class large infantry landing craft
Ships built in Perth Amboy, New Jersey
1944 ships
World War II amphibious warfare vessels of the United States
Pacific Reserve Fleet, Astoria Group
Pacific Reserve Fleet, Bremerton Group